was a town located in Tsukui District, Kanagawa Prefecture, Japan.

As of March 1, 2007, final population data before the amalgamation, the town had an estimated population of 10,720 and a density of 165.15 persons per km2. The total area was 64.91 km2.

On March 11, 2007, Fujino, along with the town of Shiroyama (also from Tsukui District), was merged into the expanded city of Sagamihara, and thus no longer exists as an independent municipality. It is now part of Midori-ku, Sagamihara.

Dissolved municipalities of Kanagawa Prefecture
Populated places disestablished in 2007